In telecommunications, the term bypass has these meanings: 
 The use of any telecommunications facilities or services that circumvents those of the local exchange common carrier. 
 Note: Bypass facilities or services may be either customer-provided or vendor-supplied. 
 An alternate circuit that is routed around equipment or a system component.  
 Note: Bypasses are often used to let system operation continue when the bypassed equipment or a system component is inoperable or unavailable.

References
Federal Standard 1037C and MIL-STD-188

Telecommunications economics